Longde may refer to:

Longdé, one of three scriptural divisions within Dzogchen
Longde County, county in Ningxia, China